The Xiagou Formation is the middle strata of the Xinminbao Group. It is named for its type site in Xiagou, in the Changma Basin of Gansu Province, northwestern China and is considered Early Cretaceous in age.  It is known outside the specialized world of Chinese geology as the site of a Lagerstätte in which the fossils were preserved of Gansus yumenensis, the earliest true modern bird.

Description 
The laminated yellowish mudstones of the Xiagou Formation are the lithified remnants of varves that were laid down as extremely fine silt settled to the bottom of a tranquil freshwater lake. The result was dense anoxic bottom sediment, where the lack of bacteria slowed the processes of decay, preserving uncompressed fossils in details that include feather impressions and remnants of the webbing between the bird's toes. The age of the formation has not yet been confidently determined. The underlying Chijinpu Formation is likely the same age as the Jehol Group due to the presence of similar fossils, meaning that the Xiagou Formation is probably slightly younger than the Jehol biota, dating to around the late Aptian.

Fossil content 
The Xiagou Formation is particularly noted for its high diversity of ancient birds. These include both modern birds close to the ancestors of living species, and related lineages now entirely extinct. Other fossils from the Xiagou Formation are characteristic of an Early Cretaceous lake ecology. There are fossils of abundant fish fauna, Charophyta and ostracods.

Invertebrates

Arthropods

Theropods

Birds

Ornithomimosaurs

Therizinosaurs

Tyrannosauroids

Cerapods

Ceratopsians

Hadrosauroids

Sauropods

Macronarians

Other vertebrates

Turtles

Fish

See also 

 List of fossil sites (with link directory)
 Lianmuqin Formation, contemporaneous fossiliferous formation of Xinjiang, western China
 Jiufotang Formation, contemporaneous fossiliferous formation of Liaoning, northeastern China
 Eumeralla Formation, contemporaenous fossiliferous formation of Victoria, Australia
 Elrhaz Formation, contemporaenous fossiliferous formation of Niger
 Crato Formation, contemporaneous fossil insect bearing Lagerstätte of Brazil

References 

Geologic formations of China
Lower Cretaceous Series of Asia
Cretaceous China
Aptian Stage
Mudstone formations
Lacustrine deposits
Lagerstätten
Fossiliferous stratigraphic units of Asia
Paleontology in Gansu